Wegner is a surname, and may refer to:


A

 Armin T. Wegner (1886–1978), German WWI soldier, writer, and human-rights activist
 Axel Wegner (born 1963), German sports shooter

B

 Benjamin Wegner (1795–1864), Prussian-Norwegian industrialist, estate owner, and timber merchant
 Benjamin Wegner (civil servant) (1868–1949), Norwegian civil servant and lawyer
 Bettina Wegner (born 1947), German songwriter

C

 Carl Wegner (born 1991), South African rugby union player
 Carl O. Wegner (1897-1986), American lawyer and politician
 Christel Wegner (born 1947), German politician (DKP)

D

 Daniel Wegner (1948–2013), American experimental social psychologist
 Dennis Wegner (born 1991), German football player

E

 Erwin Wegner (1909–1945), German athlete

F

 Franz Wegner (born 1940), German theoretical physicist
 Fritz Wegner (1924–2015), Austrian-born emigrated British illustrator

G

 Gary A. Wegner (born 1944), American astronomer
 Gudrun Wegner (1955–2005), German swimmer
 Gustav Wegner (1903–1942), German track and field athlete

H

 Hans Wegner (1914–2007), Danish furniture designer
 Henriette Wegner (1805–1875), Norwegian businesswoman and humanitarian leader
 Herman B. Wegner (1891–1964), American politician (Socialist Party of America, Wisconsin Progressive Party)

J

 Jack Wegner (1913–1982), Australian rules footballer
 Josef W. Wegner (born 1967), American Egyptologist and Professor at the University of Pennsylvania

K
 Kai Wegner (born 1972), German politician
 Kurt Wegner (1908–1983), German artist

L

 Leon Wegner (1824–1873), Polish economist and historian
 Lisa Wegner (born 1976), Canadian actress
 Lutz Michael Wegner (born 1949), German computer scientist

M

 Mark Wegner (born 1972), American baseball umpire
 Max Wegner (born 1989), German football player

O

 Oscar Wegner (born 1939), Argentine-born US-American tennis coach

P

 Peter Wegner (born 1932), American computer scientist
 Peter Wegner (American artist) (born 1963)
 Peter Wegner (Australian artist)

R

 Robert Wegner, contemporary Polish phantasy writer
 Rolf B. Wegner (born 1940), Norwegian lawyer and civil servant

U

 Ulli Wegner (born 1942), German boxing coach and former amateur boxer

W

 Waldo Wegner (1913–2001), American basketball player
 Wilhelm Wegner (1914–1989), German soldier

See also
 Brink-Wegner House
 Arne Wegner Haaland
 Christian Wegner Haaland
 Thomas Wegner Larsen Haaland
 Benjamin Wegner Nørregaard
 George Wegner Paus
 Wegener (disambiguation)
 Wegner (Norwegian family)
 Wegner Peak

German toponymic surnames
German-language surnames